Frank Bango is a New York–based singer-songwriter who has released five albums. When touring he is backed by a collective of musicians known as the Magic Fingers. He co-writes his songs with songwriter Richy Vesecky. In 2007, he was diagnosed with Hodgkins' Lymphoma.

Influences 
Bango has been compared to Elvis Costello, a comparison he initially was uncomfortable with but has since accepted. "I can see why people spot the influence but I think there are some others that, to me seem just as obvious. But if people hear Costello that's A OK with me. I used to get worried about that but after trying to fight it for years I just decided that he was a bona fide influence". He also acknowledges the influence of Brian Wilson, Ray Davies and Charlie Rich and Jonathan Richman.

Discography 

 I Set Myself on Fire Today (1994)
 Fugitive Girls (1998)
 The Unstudied Sea (2002)
 The Sweet Songs of Decay (2008)
 Touchy/Feely (2013)

References

External links 
 Official website

Living people
American male singer-songwriters
American male pop singers
American rock singers
American rock songwriters
Singer-songwriters from New York (state)
Year of birth missing (living people)